The British Chess Company (BCC) was founded by William Moffatt (1843–1918) and William Hughes and began manufacturing chess pieces in 1891.

Chess sets
The BCC was an attempt to compete against Jaques of London.  The BCC developed new manufacturing processes with new types of materials, such as celluloid for their chess pieces.  In 1891, the BCC registered the design for two of their chess sets: (1) Royal Chessmen; (2) Imperial Staunton.

See also
Jaques of London

Further reading
 Deasey, Mick & Lyons, Guy (2010). The British Chess Company, Stroud and London. 
 Fersht, Alan. (2010). Jaques and British Chess Company Chess Sets. Kaissa Publications.

References

Chess equipment manufacturers
Manufacturing companies of the United Kingdom
1891 establishments in England
Manufacturing companies established in 1891
British companies established in 1891